Néac is a commune in the Gironde department in Nouvelle-Aquitaine in southwestern France.

Population

Communication
At Néac, there is a medium-wave broadcasting station which broadcasts at 1206 kHz with 300 kW.

See also
 Communes of the Gironde department

References

Communes of Gironde